Geneva Conference may refer to:

 Geneva Naval Conference (1927), on naval arms limitation
 World Economic Conference (423 May 1927), on international trade
 World Population Conference (29 August3 September 1927), on demography
 Geneva Conference (1932), a continuation of the 1927 naval conference
 Conference for the Reduction and Limitation of Armaments, a.k.a. Geneva Disarmament Conference (19321934)
 Geneva Conference (1954), on Korea and Indochina (Vietnam)
 Geneva Conference (1973), on the Arab–Israeli conflict
 Geneva Conference (1976), on Rhodesia
 Geneva Peace Conference (1991), on Iraq and Kuwait
 Agreed Framework (1994, Genova), between North Korea and the U.S.
 Geneva I Conference on Syria (2012)
 Geneva II Conference on Syria (2014)
 Geneva peace talks on Syria (2016)
 Geneva peace talks on Syria (2017)

See also
 Geneva Conventions, for the humanitarian treatment of war (1864, 1906, 1929, 1949)
 Geneva Summit (1955), on Cold War-era world peace
 International Conference on the Settlement of the Laotian Question (1962)
 Geneva Summit (1985), on international relations and the arms race
 Geneva Accord (2003), on the IsraeliPalestinian conflict
 Geneva interim agreement on the Iranian nuclear program (2013)
 Geneva Statement on Ukraine, an agreement to de-escalate the 2014 pro-Russian unrest in Ukraine
 Geneva Declaration (1918), an abandoned agreement on creation of Yugoslavia